The Spare Tyres is a 1967 British short comedy film directed by Michael J. Lane and featuring Terence Alexander, Judy Franklin, Pauline Yates, and Frank Finlay. The screenplay concerns a couple who move to a new house.

Premise
Dennis and his wife move to a new house. Discovering a set of tyres in the garage, he spends the rest of the day trying to get rid of them.

External links

1967 films
1967 comedy films
1967 short films
British comedy short films
1960s English-language films
1960s British films